Digrammia pallidata is a species of geometrid moth in the family Geometridae. It is found in North America.

References

Further reading

 

Macariini
Articles created by Qbugbot
Moths described in 1873